The Beledweyne bombing was a bombing targeting Medina Hotel killing 57 and injuring 307 others.

The attack
On June 18, 2009, at around 10:30 am local time, an explosive-ladened Toyota car began to drive to the Medina Hotel. The car bomb was spotted before it reached the entrance of Medina Hotel, Omar Hashi Aden the National Security Minister of Somalia were about to leave the hotel when the car bomb drove through the entrance on the hotel crashing into parked cars before detonating its explosive device. The explosion severely damaged the hotel, killed 57 people, and left 307 injured.

victims
Several influential people were also killed in the car bombing, including Ambassadors, ministers, military colonels, and clan elders.

Some Influential people killed include:
Omar Hashi Aden-  Minister of Security of Somalia
Abdikarim Farah Laqanyo- former Somali ambassador to Ethiopia and the African Union
Mohamed Abdi Yarow- Colonel in the Somali Armed Forces
Mohamed Barre Fidow- Colonel in the Somali Armed Forces
Omar Hasan Dhudi- Colonel in the Somali Armed Forces
Yusuf Husen- Colonel in the Somali Armed Forces

References

2009 murders in Somalia
21st-century mass murder in Somalia
Al-Shabaab (militant group) attacks
Attacks on buildings and structures in 2009
Attacks on hotels in Somalia
2009 bombing
Building bombings in Somalia
Hotel bombings
Islamic terrorist incidents in 2009
June 2009 crimes
June 2009 events in Africa
Mass murder in 2009
Suicide bombings in 2009
Suicide bombings in Somalia
Somali Civil War (2009–present)
Suicide car and truck bombings in Africa
Terrorist incidents in Somalia in 2009
Attacks in Africa in 2009